Chrioloba is a genus of moth in the family Geometridae.

Species
Some species of this genus are:
Chrioloba andrewesi Prout, 1958 (from India)
Chrioloba bifasciata (Hampson, 1891) (from India)
Chrioloba cinerea (Butler, 1880) (from India, Taiwan)
Chrioloba costimacula  (Wileman & South, 1917) (from Taiwan)
Chrioloba etaina Swinhoe, 1900 (from India/Taiwan)
Chrioloba indicaria (Guerin-Meneville, 1843) (from India)
Chrioloba inobtrusa  (Wileman & South, 1917) (from Taiwan)
Chrioloba ochraceistriga Prout, 1958 (from India)
Chrioloba olivaria Swinhoe, 1897 (from India)
Chrioloba olivescens Hampson, 1902 (from India)
Chrioloba subusta Warren, 1893) (from India)
Chrioloba trinotata Warren, 1893) (from India)

References

Natural History Museum Lepidoptera genus database

Larentiinae
Geometridae genera